Statistics of Primera Fuerza in season 1926-27.

Overview
It was contested by 7 teams, and América won the championship.

League standings

Top goalscorers
Players sorted first by goals scored, then by last name.

References
Mexico - List of final tables (RSSSF)

1926-27
Mex
1926–27 in Mexican football